Peek-A-Boo Poker, is a video game made by the company Idea-Tek and distributed by Hacker International/Panesian in 1991 as one of their three pornographic video games for NES, the other two being Magic Bubble and Hot Slots.

Summary
One of only a few adult video games for the Nintendo Entertainment System, the distribution was limited as major national chains would not carry the items for sale.

The gameplay consists of a simple strip poker simulator in which the player can see a different reward screen, consisting of an erotic image of a woman, for every $1000 they collect in winnings, to a maximum of $5000. The game uses standard five-card draw poker rules.  There are three computer controlled players: Full House Francine, Double Dealing Debby, and Pok-er Penny.

See also
 Magic Bubble
 Hot Slots

References

Further reading
 Steven L. Kent, The First Quarter: A 25-year History of Video Games, BWD Press, 2000, .

References 
Peek-A-Boo Poker  on nesguide.com
Peek-A-Boo Poker on GameFAQs

Erotic video games
Nintendo Entertainment System games
Nintendo Entertainment System-only games
Unauthorized video games
Video games developed in Taiwan